Cisco Security Agent (CSA) was an endpoint intrusion prevention system software system made originally by Okena (formerly named StormWatch Agent), which was bought by Cisco Systems in 2003.

The software is rule-based, and examines system activity and network traffic, determining which behaviors are normal and which may indicate an attack. CSA was offered as a replacement for Cisco IDS Host Sensor, which was announced end-of-life on 21 February 2003. This end-of-life action was the result of Cisco's acquisition of Okena, Inc., and the Cisco Security Agent product line based on the Okena technology would replace the Cisco IDS Host Sensor product line from Entercept.

As a result of this end-of-life action, Cisco offered a no-cost, one-for-one product replacement/migration program for all Cisco IDS Host Sensor customers to the new Cisco Security Agent product line. The intent of this program was to support existing IDS Host Sensor customers who choose to migrate to the new Cisco Security Agent product line.

All Cisco IDS Host Sensor customers were eligible for this migration program, whether or not the customer had purchased a Cisco Software Application Support (SAS) service contract for their Cisco IDS Host Sensor products.

CSA uses a two or three-tier client-server architecture. The Management Center 'MC' (or Management Console) contains the program logic; an MS SQL database backend is used to store alerts and configuration information; the MC and SQL database may be co-resident on the same system.

The agent is installed on the desktops and/or servers to be protected and  communicates with the Management Center, sending logged events to the Management Center and receiving updates in rules when they occur.

A Network World article dated 17 December 2009 stated "Cisco hinted that it will end-of-life both CSA and MARS". Full article linked below.

On 11 June 2010, Cisco announced the end-of-life and end-of-sale of CSA. Cisco did not offer any replacement product.

See also
Network Intrusion Prevention System

References

External links
- "Surviving the Cisco CSA Transition" Endpoint Security Whitepaper
Alternative to CSA
End-of-Life Announcement - Cisco Press Release
Cisco Security Agent - Cisco's product page for the Agent software
Cisco IT Case Study about Cisco Security Agent
Cisco IDS Host Sensor Migration Program
EOS and EOL of for the Cisco IDS Host Sensor Product Line
 Cisco hinted EOL for CSA - Network World article

Internet Protocol based network software
Computer network security
MacOS security software
Windows security software
Solaris software
Cisco products